An urban refugee is a refugee who decided or was obliged to settle in an urban area rather than in a refugee camp in the country or territory where the person fled to. More than 60% of the world's refugee population and 80% of internally displaced persons (IDP) under UNHCR mandate live in urban environments. In 2009, their number was around 5.5 million people. "Urban refugee" is not a recognized legal term in the 1951 Convention relating to the Status of Refugees. However, the UNHCR has adopted a 'Policy on Refugee Protection and Solutions in Urban Areas' in 2009.

Urban refugees are among the most vulnerable groups in low income countries. According to UNHCR, the urban refugee population worldwide is very diverse, comprising a large number of women, children, and older people who have particular protection challenges. The urban refugee population face specific protecting needs attendant to urban environments: they may lack access to services, health, education and are often confronted to xenophobic attitudes in their country of asylum.

The overwhelming majority of refugees living in urban areas are to be found in the poorest and more conflict-affected regions of the world. Africa and Asia concentrate the highest number of urban refugee populations. Some war-affected countries host a huge number of both urban internally displaced people and refugees in capital cities (such as Kampala or Khartoum). Urban displaced people also live in the main cities of their country of origin: after protracted exile, many returnees prefer settling back as IDPs in cities and towns of their own country upon return.

Since around 2017, the UNHCR prioritizes urban refugees for resettlement over those refugees living in refugee camps. In Kenya, for example, only refugees living in Nairobi are submitted for resettlement places, and not those refugees living in the refugee camp site of Kakuma or Dadaab. However, Kenya's national refugee policy requires all refugees to live in camps, though this requirement is not strongly enforced.

Reasons for living in urban areas
Reasons for living in urban settings rather than in refugee camps could be specific medical care needs that cannot be provided for in camps, poor and uncertain conditions in camps, or higher than average educational achievements and aspirations, as camps do not provide many higher education opportunities. There is insufficient physical and material security in some camps. Certain groups of refugees, such as LGBTI refugees and women at high risk of gender-based violence, especially cannot be sufficiently protected from other refugees in the camps. Or it could simply be the fact that the state or territory where refugees fled to does not run refugee camps (e.g. Syria or Egypt). Some refugees leave camps in search of better economic opportunities in urban centres and to avoid being dependent on aid rations. Some even move back and forth between urban centres and refugee camps to get the best of both.

A disadvantage is that the UNHCR and other aid agencies cannot legally protect and support refugees dispersed in urban settings as much as in camps.

Notable urban refugee settlements
Amman, Jordan: 162,061
 Bangui, Central African Republic: 496,731
 Baku, Azerbaijan: 203,906
Beirut, Lebanon: 26,000
Belgrade, Serbia: 57,542
Cairo, Egypt: around 30,000 Sudanese refugees (also see sudanese refugees in Egypt)
Cape Town, South Africa
Damascus, Syria: the majority of a total of around 63,000 Iraqi refugees in Syria (also see Iraqis in Syria)
Kampala, Uganda: over 57,000 refugees and asylum seekers
Kandahar and Kabul, Afghanistan: 55,000 each
Kathmandu, Nepal: 500 Rohingya and Sri Lankan refugees as well as Ahmadiyyas from Pakistan
Kuala Lumpur, Malaysia: 62,200

Urban refugees by country and population size

References

UN High Commissioner for Refugees, UNHCR Policy on Refugee Protection and Solutions in Urban Areas, September 2009, available at: Refworld | UNHCR Policy on Refugee Protection and Solutions in Urban Areas

External links
 http://www.urban-refugees.org/
 http://www.forcedmigration.org/research-resources/expert-guides/urban-refugees
 Urban Refugees
 Urban Refugees “101”
 Urban Refugees in Nairobi: Problems of Protection, Mechanisms of Survival, and Possibilities for Integration

Refugees
Human geography
Forced migration